Arpita Chatterjee (née Pal) is an Indian actress, who mostly appears in the Odia and Bengali film industry in India. She is married to actor Prosenjit Chatterjee.

She made her film debut in 1999 with the film Tumi Ele Tai, directed by Prabhat Roy. Some of the other films in which she has starred include Deva, Devdas, Inquilaab, Prem Shakti, Pratarok, Dada Thakur, Pratibad, Utsab and Anupama. Post-marriage, she took a break from her film career to focus on family life. In 2009, she returned to acting in Ekti Tarar Khonje, directed by Abhik Mukhopadhyay.

She has acted in films of directors like Shakti Samanta and Rituporno Ghosh and has also appeared in commercials for ITC and Saffola. In 2014, she signed for her first Bollywood film Shab, directed by Onir.

Television

Filmography

References

External links

Living people
20th-century Indian actresses
Bengali actresses
Actresses in Bengali cinema
University of Calcutta alumni
21st-century Indian actresses
Actresses from Kolkata
Year of birth missing (living people)